Michael David Stevens (born January 23, 1986) is an American educator, public speaker, entertainer, and editor best known for creating and hosting the education YouTube channel Vsauce. His channel initially released video game-related content until the popularity of his educational series DOT saw discussions of general interest become the focus of Vsauce, encompassing explanations of science, philosophy, culture, and illusion.

As the host of Vsauce, Stevens has become one of the most successful YouTubers (with over 18 million subscribers and over 2.4 billion views), as well as a leading figure in the internet-driven popularization of science and education. In 2017, he created and starred in the YouTube Premium series Mind Field, and presented the nationwide educational stage tour Brain Candy Live! alongside Adam Savage.

Early life and education
Stevens was born on January 23, 1986, in Kansas City, Missouri. His mother worked as a teaching assistant, while his father was a chemical engineer. The family relocated to Stilwell, Kansas, in 1991. Stevens graduated from Blue Valley High School, where he developed a comedic personality, as well as a passion for knowledge, participating in informative speech and drama club programs. He then graduated from the University of Chicago with a bachelor's degree in psychology and English literature. As an undergraduate, Stevens became interested in video editing, having viewed a re-cut trailer of The Shining.

Career

YouTube video editing and Barely Political (2007–2010)
Under the username pooplicker888, Stevens edited and produced his first video content on YouTube in 2007, with some of his clips being featured by CollegeHumor and Funny or Die. In the same year, as the user CamPain 2008, he began using superimposition and dubbing to produce short comedic films about candidates in the 2008 United States presidential election.

Stevens' online content attracted the interest of Ben Relles, who invited him to become a member of the online comedy group then known as Barely Political. Having moved to New York City in 2008, gaining employment with both Barely Political and Next New Networks, Stevens acted alongside comedians such as Mark Douglas, Todd Womack, Andrea Feczko, and Amber Lee Ettinger, becoming well known for his role as a bearded nun. He also edited content for the channel and directed a music video parodying Owl City for Douglas' popular The Key of Awesome series.

Early Vsauce (2010–2012)

Stevens launched the Vsauce channel in 2010. Initially, it featured many contributors, with a heavy focus on video game culture. Several distinct series emerged, many of which were hosted by Stevens, including V-LIST (video game-related lists), IMG (featuring viral images), D. O. N. G. (Do Online Now, Guys, showcasing various online games and tools) and LÜT (showing nerdy and interesting products available online). He developed a catchphrase by introducing his videos with "Hey, Vsauce. Michael here", and ending his videos with "...and as always, thanks for watching".

However, it was Stevens' educational content that attracted the most attention. He says he was inspired to create scientific videos by Paul Zaloom's work on Beakman's World. Stevens realized that his most popular content tended to incorporate more serious real-world concepts, often exhibiting interdisciplinarity. Notable examples include: "What is the resolution of the eye?"; "What is the speed of dark?"; "Why is your bottom in the middle?"; and "How much money is there in the world?"

Later in 2010, Stevens launched two related channels, named Vsauce2 and Vsauce3, which eventually attained the sole hosts/producers Kevin Lieber and Jake Roper, respectively. By 2011–12, most content relating to internet and video game culture was delegated to these two channels, leaving the original Vsauce channel hosted and produced solely by Stevens, and devoted to educational discussion. Most videos are titled with a question, which Stevens answers or discusses at length, covering relevant tangents from any educational field that appeal to general interest.

Google, TED talks and science education collaborations (2012–2016)

In 2012, the year after Next New Networks was acquired by Google, Stevens also began working as a content strategist for Google in London. His role focuses on Google's YouTube platform, including meeting with fellow content creators to optimize their videos' effectiveness.

Stevens became an accomplished public speaker. He presented two TED talks in 2013: "How much does a video weigh?" at the official TEDActive, and "Why do we ask questions?" at TEDxVienna. He has also spoken at events for Adweek, VidCon, MIPTV Media Market, the Edinburgh International Television Festival, and for Novo Nordisk as a diabetes educator. In 2015, he appeared at the YouTube Fan Fest in Toronto.

In October 2015, Stevens launched the D!NG YouTube channel, to feature content from the D!NG series formerly on Vsauce.

Through his work with Vsauce, Stevens has collaborated with and appeared alongside prominent individuals within the scientific community. These include Bill Nye (on "Why did the chicken cross the road?"), Derek Muller (on quantum randomness), Jack Horner and Chris Pratt (on dinosaur studies and Jurassic World), and David Attenborough (in an interview about Planet Earth II).

Mind Field and Brain Candy Live (2016–present)
In 2016, former MythBusters co-host Adam Savage stated that he would join Stevens on a stage tour in 2017. Later in the year, Stevens published a video to Vsauce announcing that he and Savage will visit forty cities across the United States in early 2017 to present Brain Candy Live. The tour has been described as a live science-based stage show that is "between TED Talks and the Blue Man Group". A second United States tour was scheduled for March–May 2018. However, due to scheduling problems, the tour was cancelled and has not been held since. It has never officially been stated whether it will ever return.

Stevens partnered with YouTube Red (now YouTube Premium) to create and host Mind Field, which premiered in January 2017 through YouTube's paid streaming service on the Vsauce channel (all episodes have since been made available for free to non-premium subscribers, however there is some bonus content that requires a subscription to watch). Each episode of the educational series explores a different aspect of human behavior, by hearing from and conducting experiments on Stevens and guests including Dominic Monaghan. Stevens said that he had "pitched Mind Field to many television networks and it [had been] rejected".

In 2019, Stevens changed the name of the DONG channel to D!NG to avoid demonetization from YouTube's new policies on advertiser-friendliness.

Personal life
Stevens moved to London, England, in 2012. In 2016, he married Marnie and moved to Los Angeles.
Michael and Marnie had a daughter in August 2019.

In his Field Day documentary, in which prominent filmmakers undertake a project of their choosing, Stevens decided to visit Whittier, Alaska, to investigate the uniqueness of the remote town.

Filmography

Awards

References

External links
 
 
 TED Speaker profile

1986 births
Living people
American emigrants to England
American YouTubers
Educators from Kansas
Educators from Missouri
Google employees
Online edutainment
People from Kansas City, Missouri
American expatriates in the United Kingdom
People from Stilwell, Kansas
Science communicators
University of Chicago alumni
Video bloggers
Educational and science YouTubers